Procter & Gamble (P&G) has a long history on Tyneside, starting from its purchase of Thomas Hedley Co. in 1930. Thomas Hedley was a company local to Newcastle upon Tyne, and was the start of P&Gs expansion from its American operations. P&G moved into Hedley's Newcastle City Road site, and had its headquarters in Collingwood Street, Newcastle. It continued its UK operations by opening up a Manchester factory in 1933 (which expanded rapidly; 100% expansion by 1936), and constructing a London plant in 1937, however, it was Tyneside where P&G was solidly based. By 1948 these offices were proving inadequate for an expanding post-war business, and in 1953 P&G moved its UK administrative centre to purpose built offices in Gosforth, Newcastle. The building was named Hedley House, in remembrance of the roots of P&G in Tyneside.

In 1957 the Hedley Research Laboratories were opened on Whitley Road, Longbenton. They were officially opened on June 11 by Hugh Percy, 10th Duke of Northumberland. It cost £500,000 to build and equip. The site has been upgraded many times in the 50 years since its opening and currently focuses on the development of laundry detergents and machine dishwashing products for all parts of the world.

In 1962 Shultons established an Old Spice plant at the Northumberland town of Seaton Delaval. When Shultons was acquired by Procter & Gamble in 1990, it became another part of P&G's presence on Tyneside. The plant now manufactures many of fine fragrances that P&G produce, both under their own brands and under licence. It is also the site for the 'company shop', where P&G staff and retirees can purchase P&G goods for a reduced price.

In 2000, the Gosforth offices were closed 43 years after their opening. This was done as part of a big corporate restructuring within P&G globally, and the UK's administrative centre became the Brooklands complex in Weybridge, Surrey. However, one of three global business service centres was established at Cobalt Business Park in North Tyneside. P&G has one building on the park, offering financial services to P&G companies in Europe, the Middle East and Africa. As has been the tradition, one pays homage to Thomas Hedley Co. and is called New Hedley House.

Procter & Gamble